Three Pieces for Orchestra may refer to:
 Three Pieces for Orchestra (Berg)
 , part of Bruckner's Four Orchestral Pieces

See also
 Three Pieces for Blues Band and Symphony Orchestra,  a 1968 avant-garde musical composition by William Russo